Sebastian Neumann (born 18 February 1991) is a German retired footballer, who played as a defender.

Career
Neumann made his debut for Hertha's first team on 14 August 2010 in a DFB-Pokal match against SC Pfullendorf, and played his first league game on 22 October 2010 in a 2–0 home win over SpVgg Greuther Fürth. He signed for VfL Osnabrück in August 2012. He joined VfR Aalen two years later.

Neumann won his first cap for the German U-21 team on 11 October 2010 against Ukraine.

He moves to MSV Duisburg for the 2018–19 season.

On 2 January 2020, he retired due to injuries.

He was appointed as the interim manager of Würzburger Kickers on 4 October 2021 but was replaced by Danny Schwarz nine days later.

References

External links
Sebastian Neumann at DFB.de 

1991 births
Living people
Footballers from Berlin
German footballers
Germany under-21 international footballers
Germany youth international footballers
Association football defenders
Bundesliga players
2. Bundesliga players
3. Liga players
Regionalliga players
Hertha BSC players
Hertha BSC II players
VfL Osnabrück players
VfR Aalen players
Würzburger Kickers players
MSV Duisburg players
German football managers